Hanoi Sign Language is the deaf-community sign language of the city of Hanoi in Vietnam. It is about 50% cognate with the other sign languages of Vietnam, and its vocabulary has been extensively influenced by the French Sign Language once taught in Vietnamese schools for the deaf.

References

Languages of Vietnam
Sign languages